Timm Thaler oder Das verkaufte Lachen (roughly translated as Timm Thaler, or the Traded Laughter and best known as simply Timm Thaler) is a 1962 children's novel by German author James Krüss.  Regarded by the Oxford Encyclopedia of Children's Literature as Krüss' best known children's book, Timm Thaler tells the story of a boy who trades his enchanting laughter to a wealthy mysterious Mephistopheles-like Baron in exchange for the ability to win any bet he makes. Regretting the exchange, he undertakes a four-year journey to win his laughter back.  In 1979, Krüss wrote a sequel novel, Timm Thalers Puppen oder Die verkaufte Menschenliebe (roughly translated as Timm Thaler's Puppets, or the Traded Love for Mankind).

The popular story was subsequently adapted into a 13-part German children's television miniseries in 1979, and again, as a 2-part Soviet musical television movie in 1981.  The story was later re-adapted into an animated German television series in 2002.

See also

Timm Thaler (1979 TV miniseries) (English Wikipedia)
[[:ru:Проданный смех|The Traded Laughter (1981 TV film)]] (Russian Wikipedia)
Timm Thaler (2002 animated series) (German Wikipedia)'' (2017 film) (German Wikipedia)

References

1962 German novels
German children's novels
German fantasy novels
German-language novels
Metafictional novels
German novels adapted into television shows
German novels adapted into films
1962 children's books